Fulai Fulko Mausam Timilai is a Nepalese romance, drama, and comedy film directed by Dinesh D.C. The film stars Neeta Dhungana, Aamesh Bhandari, Vijay Lama, Hiunbala Gautam, Geeta Adhikari, Guru Kedar Baral, and Madav Kharel. It was released on March 4, 2016. The movie features the love story between characters Neeta and Aamesh after they decide to break up. The audio cassette of the songs of the film was released by the Prime Minister of Nepal, KP Sharma Oli at his official residence Baluwatar. Upon release, the movie received generally mixed reviews from film critics.

Plot 
The film's plot focuses on the love story between Neeta Dhungana and Aamesh Bhandari. During the couple's relationship, they decide to break up for unknown reasons. Due to this, the two former lovers must forget each other.

Cast
 Neeta Dhungana
 Aamesh Bhandari
 Vijay Lama 
 Hiunbala Gautam
 Geeta Adhikari
 Guru Kedar Baral 
 Madav Kharel
 Anurodh Adhikari

References

External links 
 

2010s Nepali-language films
Nepalese romantic comedy films
2016 films
Nepalese comedy-drama films